Shaheed Benazirabad Division is an administrative division of the Sindh Province of Pakistan. It was created in 6 June 2014, formerly a part of Hyderabad Division.

Nawabshah is the divisional headquarters of Shaheed Benazirabad Division. The division currently consists on three districts.It comprises the following districts:

Naushahro Feroze District

Naushahro Feroze Tehsil
Moro Tehsil
Kandiaro Tehsil
Bhiria Tehsil
Mehrabpur Tehsil

Shaheed Benazir Abad District

 Nawabshah Tehsil
Sakrand Tehsil
 Qazi Ahmed Tehsil
Daur Tehsil

Sanghar District

 Sanghar Tehsil
 Tando Adam Khan Tehsil
 Shahdadpur Tehsil
 Khipro Tehsil
 Sinjhoro Tehsil
 Jam Nawaz Ali Tehsil

See also
 Nawabshah

References

Divisions of Sindh